Rubrosterone is a steroid found in insects and plants. Due to its similarity with vertebral steroids, there has been some interest in the study of its effects on humans.

References

External links
 http://www.chemblink.com/products/19466-41-2.htm

Androstanes